Gerra aelia is a species of moth in the family Noctuidae. It is found in the western parts of Panama and in the northern and southeastern parts of Costa Rica.

References 

Agaristinae
Moths described in 1889